Ignacio García may refer to:
 Ignacio García Malo (1760–1812), Spanish playwright, translator, Hellenist and writer
 Ignacio García (footballer) (born 1986), Bolivian football defender
 Ignacio M. Garcia, professor of Western American History at Brigham Young University